Alex Keddie is a Scottish former footballer who played as a defender. Keddie began his career with Leeds United and St Johnstone, before moving into Junior football with Cumbernauld United and Shotts Bon Accord. At the age of 24, Keddie returned to full-time football and played for Stranraer, Ross County, Dunfermline Athletic and Arbroath, before retiring in 2014.

Career
He started his career in the youth team of Leeds United, where he won the FA Youth Cup, before having a short spell with Scottish Premier League side St Johnstone. After leaving St Johnstone, Keddie played Junior football with Cumbernauld United and Shotts Bon Accord.

After 6 years away from professional football, Keddie signed with Scottish First Division side Stranraer at the age of 24, before moving to Ross County after one season. Keddie spent 4 years with the Highland team, making 140 appearances in total and scoring 10 goals.

In May 2010, Keddie signed for Dunfermline Athletic. During his first season with the Pars, he won promotion to the SPL during the 2010–11 season, becoming a regular starter in the latter part of the season. After a fairly unimpressive second season with the side, which culminated in relegation and an immediate return to the First Division, he was released at the end of the 2011–12 season along with a number of other first team players including club captain, Austin McCann. Keddie made 36 top tier starts in central defence for the Pars, who conceded 82 goals during that season.

Keddie signed for Arbroath during the summer of 2012. After two seasons and over 70 appearances with the Red Lichties, Keddie left the club in May 2014.

Personal life
Keddie holds an honours degree in Chartered Surveying from Glasgow Caledonian University, and after leaving full-time football in 2012, opened a barber shop in Glasgow with his sister.

Honours
Scottish Challenge Cup: 1
 2006–07
Scottish First Division: 1
 Winner:2010–2011

References

External links

1981 births
Living people
Leeds United F.C. players
St Johnstone F.C. players
Cumbernauld United F.C. players
Shotts Bon Accord F.C. players
Stranraer F.C. players
Ross County F.C. players
Dunfermline Athletic F.C. players
Arbroath F.C. players
Scottish Football League players
Scottish footballers
Footballers from Glasgow
Association football defenders
Scottish Premier League players
Scottish Professional Football League players
Alumni of Glasgow Caledonian University